The Fifth North Carolina Provincial Congress was the last of five extra-legal unicameral bodies that met beginning in the summer of 1774.  They were modeled after the colonial lower house (House of Commons).  These congresses created a government structure, issued bills of credit to pay for the movement, organized an army for defense, wrote a constitution and bill of rights that established the state of North Carolina, and elected their first acting governor in the fifth congress that met in 1776.   These congresses paved the way for the first meeting of the North Carolina General Assembly on April 7, 1777 in New Bern, North Carolina.  The Fifth Congress met in Halifax from November 12 to December 23, 1776. Richard Caswell served as president, with Cornelius Harnett as vice-president.

Legislation
This congress approved the first Constitution of North Carolina, along with a "Declaration of Rights" on December 18, 1776.  It elected Richard Caswell to serve as acting governor until the province's first General Assembly in 1777 could meet to elect a governor.  The congress dealt extensively with raising a militia of 5, 000 men.   They also discussed the Cherokee War in the western region of the state.

Delegates

Each county was authorized five delegates to this congress.  Some counties only had four delegates.  In addition, nine districts or borough towns were also authorized a single delegate.  These districts were the larger towns and population centers of the state.  The concept of district representation was a hold over from the Province of North Carolina in colonial times. Washington District, in the western end of the state and later became a county, elected four delegates to the congress.  The following list shows the names of the delegates and the counties or districts that they represented:

Notes:

See also
 Provincial Congress
 North Carolina General Assembly

References

Further reading
 
 
 

Provincial Fifth
1776 establishments in North Carolina
1776 disestablishments in North Carolina
Provincial Fifth
North Carolina
 Provincial Fifth